Austroaeschna pinheyi is a species of Australian dragonfly in the family Telephlebiidae,
known as an inland darner. It has only been found in the Carnarvon Gorge vicinity of Central Queensland, where it inhabits streams.

Austroaeschna pinheyi is a shorter-bodied blackish dragonfly with pale markings.

Etymology
In 2001, Günther Theischinger named this species pinheyi, an eponym in acknowledgement of his colleague Elliot Pinhey, an entomologist who worked extensively in Africa and made major contributions to the knowledge of dragonflies and other insect groups.

Gallery

Note
Until recently, Austroaeschna pinheyi was considered to be a subspecies of Austroaeschna unicornis.

See also
 List of dragonflies of Australia

References

Telephlebiidae
Odonata of Australia
Endemic fauna of Australia
Taxa named by Günther Theischinger
Insects described in 2001